Punctuation (or sometimes interpunction) is the use of spacing, conventional signs (called punctuation marks), and certain typographical devices as aids to the understanding and correct reading of written text, whether read silently or aloud. Another description is, "It is the practice, action, or system of inserting points or other small marks into texts in order to aid interpretation; division of text into sentences, clauses, etc., by means of such marks."

In written English, punctuation is vital to disambiguate the meaning of sentences. For example: "woman, without her man, is nothing" (emphasizing the importance of men to women), and "woman: without her, man is nothing" (emphasizing the importance of women to men) have very different meanings; as do "eats shoots and leaves" (which means the subject consumes plant growths) and "eats, shoots, and leaves" (which means the subject eats first, then fires a weapon, and then leaves the scene). The sharp differences in meaning are produced by the simple differences in punctuation within the example pairs, especially the latter.

The rules of punctuation vary with language, location, register, and time and are constantly evolving. Certain aspects of punctuation are stylistic and are thus the author's (or editor's) choice, or tachygraphic (shorthand) language forms, such as those used in online chat and text messages.

History
The first writing systems were either logographic or syllabic; for example, Chinese and Mayan script, which do not necessarily require punctuation, especially spacing. This is because the entire morpheme or word is typically clustered within a single glyph, so spacing does not help as much to distinguish where one word ends and the other starts. Disambiguation and emphasis can easily be communicated without punctuation by employing a separate written form distinct from the spoken form of the language that uses slightly different phraseology. Even today, written English differs subtly from spoken English because not all emphasis and disambiguation is possible to convey in print, even with punctuation.

Ancient Chinese classical texts were transmitted without punctuation. However, many Warring States period bamboo texts contain the symbols  and  indicating the end of a chapter and full stop, respectively. By the Song dynasty, addition of punctuation to texts by scholars to aid comprehension became common.

The earliest alphabetic writing – Phoenician, Hebrew, and others of the same family – had no capitalization, no spaces, no vowels (see abjad) and few punctuation marks. This worked as long as the subject matter was restricted to a limited range of topics (for example, writing used for recording business transactions). Punctuation is historically an aid to reading aloud.

The oldest known document using punctuation is the Mesha Stele (9th century BC). This employs points between the words and horizontal strokes between the sense section as punctuation.

Western Antiquity
Most texts were still written in scriptura continua, that is without any separation between words. However, the Greeks were sporadically using punctuation marks consisting of vertically arranged dots—usually two (dicolon) or three (tricolon)—in around the 5th century BC as an aid in the oral delivery of texts. Greek playwrights such as Euripides and Aristophanes used symbols to distinguish the ends of phrases in written drama: this essentially helped the play's cast to know when to pause. After 200 BC, the Greeks used Aristophanes of Byzantium's system (called ) of a single dot placed at varying heights to mark up speeches at rhetorical divisions:
  – a high  to mark off a sentence.
In addition, the Greeks used the paragraphos (or gamma) to mark the beginning of sentences, marginal diples to mark quotations, and a koronis to indicate the end of major sections.

The Romans also occasionally used symbols to indicate pauses, but the Greek —under the name distinctiones—prevailed by the 4th century AD as reported by Aelius Donatus and Isidore of Seville (7th century). Also, texts were sometimes laid out , where every sentence had its own separate line. Diples were used, but by the late period these often degenerated into comma-shaped marks.

Medieval
Punctuation developed dramatically when large numbers of copies of the Bible started to be produced. These were designed to be read aloud, so the copyists began to introduce a range of marks to aid the reader, including indentation, various punctuation marks (diple), and an early version of initial capitals. Jerome and his colleagues, who made a translation of the Bible into Latin, the Vulgate, employed a layout system based on established practices for teaching the speeches of Demosthenes and Cicero. Under his layout  every sense-unit was indented and given its own line. This layout was solely used for biblical manuscripts during the 5th–9th centuries but was abandoned in favor of punctuation.

In the 7th–8th centuries Irish and Anglo-Saxon scribes, whose native languages were not derived from Latin, added more visual cues to render texts more intelligible. Irish scribes introduced the practice of word separation. Likewise, insular scribes adopted the  system while adapting it for minuscule script (so as to be more prominent) by using not differing height but rather a differing number of marks—aligned horizontally (or sometimes triangularly)—to signify a pause's value: one mark for a minor pause, two for a medium one, and three for a major. The same marks could be used in the margin to mark off quotations.

In the late 8th century a different system emerged in France under the Carolingian dynasty. Originally indicating how the voice should be modulated when chanting the liturgy, the  migrated into any text meant to be read aloud, and then to all manuscripts.  first reached England in the late 10th century, probably during the Benedictine reform movement, but was not adopted until after the Norman conquest. In the late 11th/early 12th century the  disappeared and was taken over by the simple  (now with two distinct values).

Direct quotations were marked with marginal diples, as in Antiquity, but from at least the 12th century scribes also began entering diples (sometimes double) within the column of text.

Printing-press era

The amount of printed material and its readership began to increase after the invention of moveable type in Europe in the 1450s. Luthers German bible translation was one of the first mass printed works, he used only virgule, full stop and less than 1% question marks as punctuation. The focus of punctuation still was rhetorical, to aid reading aloud. As explained by writer and editor Lynne Truss, "The rise of printing in the 14th and 15th centuries meant that a standard system of punctuation was urgently required." Printed books, whose letters were uniform, could be read much more rapidly than manuscripts. Rapid reading, or reading aloud, did not allow time to analyze sentence structures. This increased speed led to the greater use and finally standardization of punctuation, which showed the relationships of words with each other: where one sentence ends and another begins, for example.

The introduction of a standard system of punctuation has also been attributed to the Venetian printers Aldus Manutius and his grandson. They have been credited with popularizing the practice of ending sentences with the colon or full stop (period), inventing the semicolon, making occasional use of parentheses, and creating the modern comma by lowering the virgule. By 1566, Aldus Manutius the Younger was able to state that the main object of punctuation was the clarification of syntax.

By the 19th century, punctuation in the western world had evolved "to classify the marks hierarchically, in terms of weight". Cecil Hartley's poem identifies their relative values:
The stop point out, with truth, the time of pause
A sentence doth require at ev'ry clause.
At ev'ry comma, stop while one you count;
At semicolon, two is the amount;
A colon doth require the time of three;
The period four, as learned men agree.
The use of punctuation was not standardised until after the invention of printing. According to the 1885 edition of The American Printer, the importance of punctuation was noted in various sayings by children such as
Charles the First walked and talked
Half an hour after his head was cut off.
With a semi-colon and a comma added, it reads as follows:
Charles the First walked and talked;
Half an hour after, his head was cut off.
In a 19th-century manual of typography, Thomas MacKellar writes:

Typewriters and electronic communication
The introduction of electrical telegraphy with a limited set of transmission codes and typewriters with a limited set of keys influenced punctuation subtly.  For example, curved quotes and apostrophes were all collapsed into two characters (' and ").  The hyphen, minus sign, and dashes of various widths have been collapsed into a single character (-), sometimes repeated to represent a long dash.  The spaces of different widths available to professional typesetters were generally replaced by a single full-character width space, with typefaces monospaced.  In some cases a typewriter keyboard didn't include an exclamation point (!) but this was constructed by the overstrike of an apostrophe and a period; the original Morse code did not have an exclamation point.

These simplifications have been carried forward into digital writing, with teleprinters and the ASCII character set essentially supporting the same characters as typewriters. Treatment of whitespace in HTML discouraged the practice (in English prose) of putting two full spaces after a full stop, since a single or double space would appear the same on the screen. (Some style guides now discourage double spaces, and some electronic writing tools, including Wikipedia's software, automatically collapse double spaces to single.) The full traditional set of typesetting tools became available with the advent of desktop publishing and more sophisticated word processors. Despite the widespread adoption of character sets like Unicode that support the punctuation of traditional typesetting, writing forms like text messages tend to use the simplified ASCII style of punctuation, with the addition of new non-text characters like emoji. Informal text speak tends to drop punctuation when not needed, including some ways that would be considered errors in more formal writing.

In the computer era, punctuation characters were recycled for use in programming languages and URLs. Due to its use in email and Twitter handles, the at sign (@) has gone from an obscure character mostly used by sellers of bulk commodities (10 pounds @$2.00 per pound), to a very common character in common use for both technical routing and an abbreviation for "at". The tilde (~), in moveable type only used in combination with vowels, for mechanical reasons ended up as a separate key on mechanical typewriters, and like @ it has been put to completely new uses.

In English

There are two major styles of punctuation in English: British or American. These two styles differ mainly in the way in which they handle quotation marks, particularly in conjunction with other punctuation marks. In British English, punctuation marks such as full stops and commas are placed inside the quotation mark only if they are part of what is being quoted, and placed outside the closing quotation mark if part of the containing sentence.  In American English, however, such punctuation is generally placed inside the closing quotation mark regardless. This rule varies for other punctuation marks; for example, American English follows the British English rule when it comes to semicolons, colons, question marks, and exclamation points. The serial comma is used much more often in the United States than in England.

Other languages

Other languages of Europe use much the same punctuation as English. The similarity is so strong that the few variations may confuse a native English reader. Quotation marks are particularly variable across European languages. For example, in French and Russian, quotes would appear as:  (in French, each "double punctuation", as the guillemet, requires a non-breaking space; in Russian it does not).

In French of France and Belgium, the signs : ; ? and ! are always preceded by a thin non-breaking space. In Canadian French, this is only the case for :.

In Georgian, three dots, were formerly used as a sentence or paragraph divider. It is still sometimes used in calligraphy.

Spanish and Asturian (both of them Romance languages used in Spain) use an inverted question mark  at the beginning of a question and the normal question mark at the end, as well as an inverted exclamation mark  at the beginning of an exclamation and the normal exclamation mark at the end.

Armenian uses several punctuation marks of its own. The full stop is represented by a colon, and vice versa; the exclamation mark is represented by a diagonal similar to a tilde , while the question mark  resembles an unclosed circle placed after the last vowel of the word.

Arabic, Urdu, and Persian—written from right to left—use a reversed question mark: , and a reversed comma: . This is a modern innovation; pre-modern Arabic did not use punctuation.

Originally, Sanskrit had no punctuation. In the 17th century, Sanskrit and Marathi, both written using Devanagari, started using the vertical bar  to end a line of prose and double vertical bars  in verse.

Punctuation was not used in Chinese, Japanese, Korean and Vietnamese Chu Nom writing until the adoption of punctuation from the West in the late 19th and early 20th century. In unpunctuated texts, the grammatical structure of sentences in classical writing is inferred from context. Most punctuation marks in modern Chinese, Japanese, and Korean have similar functions to their English counterparts; however, they often look different and have different customary rules.

In the Indian subcontinent,  is sometimes used in place of colon or after a subheading. Its origin is unclear, but could be a remnant of the British Raj. For example, Rs. 20/- or Rs. 20/= implies 20 rupees whole.

Thai, Khmer, Lao and Burmese did not use punctuation until the adoption of punctuation from the West in the 20th century. Blank spaces are more frequent than full stops or commas.

Novel punctuation marks

Interrobang

In 1962, American advertising executive Martin K. Speckter proposed the interrobang (‽), a combination of the question mark and exclamation point, to mark rhetorical questions or questions stated in a tone of disbelief. Although the new punctuation mark was widely discussed in the 1960s, it failed to achieve widespread use.

"Love point" and similar marks
In 1966, the French author Hervé Bazin proposed a series of six innovative punctuation marks in his book  ("Let's pluck the bird", 1966). These were:
 the "irony point" or "irony mark"
 the "love point"
 the "conviction point"                                                                                                                                   
 the "authority point"
 the "acclamation point"
 the "doubt point"

"Question comma", "exclamation comma"

An international patent application was filed, and published in 1992 under World Intellectual Property Organization (WIPO) number WO9219458, for two new punctuation marks: the "question comma" and the "exclamation comma". The question comma has a comma instead of the dot at the bottom of a question mark, while the exclamation comma has a comma in place of the point at the bottom of an exclamation mark. These were intended for use as question and exclamation marks within a sentence, a function for which normal question and exclamation marks can also be used, but which may be considered obsolescent. The patent application entered into the national phase only in Canada. It was advertised as lapsing in Australia on 27 January 1994 and in Canada on 6 November 1995.

Punctuation marks in Unicode

See also
 Diacritic
 James while John had had had had had had had had had had had a better effect on the teacher, a word puzzle
 Obelism, the practice of annotating manuscripts with marks set in the margins
 Orthography, the category of written conventions that includes punctuation as well as spelling, hyphenation, capitalization, word breaks, and emphasis
 Scribal abbreviations, abbreviations used by ancient and medieval scribes writing in Latin
 Terminal punctuation
 History of sentence spacing for typographical details
 Tironian notes, a system of shorthand that consisted of about 4,000 signs
 Usage

References

Notes

Further reading

External links 

 Larry Trask: Guide to Punctuation  A helpful online resource
 History of Punctuation, in French  Helpful photographs of early punctuation
 Punctuation Marks in English: Clarity in Expression
 Unicode reference tables:
 Unicode collation charts—including punctuation marks, sorted by shape
 
 
 
 
 
 Ethiopic script
 Automatic Recovery of Capitalization and Punctuation of Automatic Speech Transcripts
 English Punctuation Rules
 Punctuation marks with independent clauses, by Jennifer Frost

 
Typography